The 1971 Kent State Golden Flashes football team was an American football team that represented Kent State University in the Mid-American Conference (MAC) during the 1971 NCAA University Division football season. In their first season under head coach Don James, the Golden Flashes compiled a 3–8 record (0–5 against MAC opponents), finished in sixth place in the MAC, and were outscored by a total of 304 to 169.

The team's statistical leaders included Renard Harmon with 566 rushing yards, Larry Hayes with 848 passing yards, and Jeff Murrey with 259 receiving yards. On defense, Jack Lambert led the team with 155 total tackles, including 68 solo tackles. Other notable players on the team included Nick Saban and Gary Pinkel.

Don James was announced as Kent State's football coach on December 12, 1970, following the resignation of Dave Puddington. Prior to being hired by Kent State, James was a defensive coach for Colorado.

Schedule

Roster

References

Kent State
Kent State Golden Flashes football seasons
Kent State Golden Flashes football